is a former Japanese football player and manager.

Playing career
Shunji Kishi played for Yanmar Diesel / Cerezo Osaka as defender from 1980 to 1994.

Coaching career
Since 1995, Shunji Kishi became coach for Cerezo Osaka youth team. In May, 2007, the Cerezo Osaka top team manager, Satoshi Tsunami, resigned his position. Shunji Kishi became top team coach and managed the club in the interim, until a new manager, Levir Culpi, was appointed.

References

1961 births
Living people
Association football people from Tokushima Prefecture
Japanese footballers
Japan Soccer League players
Japan Football League (1992–1998) players
Cerezo Osaka players
Japanese football managers
J2 League managers
Cerezo Osaka managers
Association football defenders